Zoran Damjanovski is a Mayor of Kumanovo Municipality in Macedonia serving his third term.

See also
Mayor of Kumanovo 
List of Mayors of Kumanovo 
Kumanovo Municipality 
Kumanovo shootings 
Timeline of Kumanovo

References

External links
 Official Facebook Page

Mayors of Kumanovo
1956 births
Living people